The 2014 Tameside Metropolitan Borough Council election took place on 22 May 2014 to elect members of Tameside Metropolitan Borough Council in England. This was on the same day as other local elections.

Results

Ashton Hurst ward

Ashton St. Michael's ward

Ashton Waterloo ward

Audenshaw ward

Denton North East ward

Denton South ward

Denton West ward

Droylsden East ward

Droylsden West ward

Dukinfield ward

Dukinfield / Stalybridge ward

Hyde Godley ward

Hyde Newton ward

Hyde Werneth ward

Longdendale ward

Mossley ward

St. Peters ward

Stalybridge North ward

Stalybridge South ward

References

2014 English local elections
2014
2010s in Greater Manchester